Matthew Joseph Williams Drutt (born December 8, 1962) is an American curator and writer who specializes in modern and contemporary art and design.  Based in New York, he has owned and operated his independent consulting practice Drutt Creative Arts Management (DCAM) since 2013l. He is currently working with the Nationalmuseum Stockholm on an exhibition and publication (2022 - 2023) of modern and contemporary American crafts gifted from artists and collectors in the United States to the museum, originally organized by his mother, Helen Drutt. He has worked more recently with the Eckbo Foundation in Oslo on the first major monograph of Thorwald Hellesen published in English and Norwegian in (2019 - 2022) by Arnoldsche Art Publishers. He is currently also developing several other titles with the publisher. Formerly, he worked with the Beyeler Foundation in Switzerland (2013–2016) and the State Hermitage Museum in Russia (2013–2014), consulting on exhibitions, publications, and collections. He continues to serve as an Advisory Curator to the Hermitage Museum Foundation Israel. In 2006, the French Government awarded him the Chevalier de l'Ordre des Arts et des Lettres, and in 2003, his exhibition Kazimir Malevich: Suprematism won Best Monographic Exhibition Organized Nationally from the International Association of Art Critics.

Early life, education
He received his B.A. degree cum laude from New York University in 1986 with a double major in History of Art and Russian Studies, and earned an M.A. degree from Yale University in 1987.

Career
From 1993 to 2001, he was a curator at the Solomon R. Guggenheim Museum, where he organized shows such as Amazons of the Avant-Garde, The Art of the Motorcycle  in 1998, Mediascape in 1996, Josef Albers in 1995, and Frank Lloyd Wright in 1994. He was Chief Curator of The Menil Collection in Houston from 2001 to 2006, where he organized exhibitions of Robert Gober, Ellsworth Kelly, Olafur Eliasson, Donald Judd, Anna Gaskell, and Vik Muniz, as well as collection-based projects.

In 1999, Drutt organized the exhibit Bill Fontana: Acoustical Visions of Venice for the 48th Venice Biennale in cooperation with The Bohen Foundation, and in 2011 he returned to curate Anton Ginzburg: At The Back of the North Wind for the 54th Venice Biennale.

Among his exhibition catalogs are Kazimir Malevich: Suprematism, an exhibit centered on Russian artist Kazimir Malevich, who had founded the avant-garde  Suprematist movement in the early 1900s. It was published by Harry N. Abrams, Inc. in 2003. The exhibition won Best Monographic Exhibition Organized Nationally from the International Association of Art Critics.

From 2006 to 2010, he was executive director of the international artist residency program Artpace in San Antonio, where he produced solo exhibitions of artists Kehinde Wiley, David Adjaye, Kate Gilmore, and Nathan Carter, among others. In 2010, he also curated the yearlong exhibition Felix Gonzalez-Torres: Billboards, the first show devoted to this artist's public work in depth. After this, he was executive director of Lisson Gallery in London, Milan, and New York, where he oversaw its international sales of artists, including Daniel Buren, Tony Cragg, Ryan Gander, Dan Graham, Shirazeh Houshiary, Anish Kapoor, Jason Martin, Jonathan Monk, and Lawrence Weiner. From 2012 to 2013, he was the founding executive director of the Blouin Cultural Advisory Group, and was curator for the Louise Blouin Foundation in London, where he organized exhibitions of work by Chris Marker in 2012 and Olga de Amaral in 2013.

He has also served as a visiting professor at Columbia University in both the Graduate School of the Arts and the Avery School of Architecture and at the Fashion Institute of Technology.

Boards and committees
Drutt serves on numerous boards and committees. He was chair of the Arts Committee for LongHouse Reserve from 2018 - 2020 and he was a founding member of the El Lissitzky Foundation in Eindhoven from 2013 to 2019. He was on the advisory board of the Hermitage Museum Foundation from 2012 to 2015 and The Fabric Workshop and Museum's artist advisory board since 2010. Previously, he was on the advisory boards of the American Academy in Berlin, American Academy in Rome, and Documenta in Kassel, Germany. He was a chair for Luminaria: Arts Night in San Antonio and the American Association of Museum Directors. He had also worked with both Public Art San Antonio and Etant donnés: The French-American Fund for Contemporary Art.

Recognition

In 2006, the French Government awarded him the Chevalier de l'Ordre des Arts et des Lettres for accomplishments in the international art world. In 2003, his exhibition, Kazimir Malevich: Suprematism, received the award for Best Monographic Exhibition Organized Nationally from the International Association of Art Critics, who also awarded him 2nd place in 1996 in the same category for Max Beckmann in Exile.

Exhibitions
The following is a collection of approximately one third the exhibits Drutt has organized:
Philadelphia: Then and Now. 1950 - 2019, Globe Dye Works, Philadelphia, November 2019
Jewelry in America, Galerie Wittenbrink, Munich, March 2018
In Search of 0,10: The Last Futurist Exhibition of Painting, Fondation Beyeler, Riehen, Switzerland, October 4, 2015 – January 17, 2016
Million Stone: An Installation by Ahmet Güneştekin, La Pietà, La Biennale di Venzia – 56th International Art Exhibition, May 6 – November 22, 2015
Gifts from America 1948 – 2013. Modern and Contemporary Applied Arts from the Hermitage Museum Foundation, State Hermitage Museum, St. Petersburg, December 3, 2014 – June 8, 2015
Olga de Amaral: Recent Work, Louise Blouin Foundation, London, October 14 – 28, 2013
Chris Marker. Selected Works: 1951–2011, Louise Blouin Foundation, London. October 9 – November 3, 2012
Anton Ginzburg: At the Back of the North Wind, 54th Venice Biennale, June 1 – November 27, 2011
Gabriel Vormstein: The Teeth of the Wind and the Sea, Artpace San Antonio, January 13 – May 1, 2011Mediascape, Guggenheim Museum Soho, June 14 – September 15, 1996
Matthew Ronay: Between the Worlds, Artpace San Antonio, September 23, 2010 – January 3, 2011. Traveled to Andrea Rosen Gallery, New York June 24 - August 19, 2011 and La Conservera, Murcia, Spain, February 4 - July 1, 2012.
Felix Gonzalez-Torres: Billboards, Artpace San Antonio, January 1 – December 31, 2010. A year-long, statewide exhibition featuring the work of one of Artpace's most renowned residents held on the occasion of the institution's 15th anniversary
Robert Gober: The Meat Wagon, The Menil Collection, Houston, October 28, 2005 – January 22, 2006
Ellsworth Kelly: Tablet, The Menil Collection, Houston, February 11 – May 1, 2005
Olafur Eliasson: Photographs, The Menil Collection, Houston, May 27 – September 5, 2004
Kazimir Malevich: Suprematism, co-organized by the Solomon R. Guggenheim Foundation, New York, and Menil Foundation, Inc., Houston (traveled to Deutsche Guggenheim Berlin, January 15 -  April 22, 2003; Solomon R. Guggenheim Museum, New York, June 17 – September 10; The Menil Collection, Houston, October 3, 2003 – January 11, 2004. (2003 AICA Best Monographic Exhibition Organized Nationally)
Amazons of the Avant-Garde. Six Russian Artists: Alexandra Exter, Natalia Goncharova, Liubov Popova, Olga Rozanova, Varvara Stepanova, and Nadezhda Udaltsova. Traveled (1999–2001)
Bill Fontana: Acoustical Visions of Venice, 48th Venice Biennale, June 13 – November 30, 1999
The Art of the Motorcycle, Solomon R. Guggenheim Museum, June 26 – September 20, 1998. Traveled until 2003.
Guggenheim Virtual Museum, a collaboration with Asymptote Architects, Solomon R. Guggenheim Museum, launched March 2, 1998
Max Beckmann in Exile, Guggenheim Museum SoHo, New York, NY, October 9, 1996 – January 5, 1997

Publications
Note that the following list doesn't include most exhibition catalogs Drutt has written, though many have been published. He wrote his first exhibition catalog in 1992, for Albert Paley: Sculptural Adornment at the Renwick Gallery, an exhibit by the Smithsonian Institution. It was published by the University of Washington Press in 1992.
"Pavel Opočensky," in 3/4 of my life. Jewellery by Pavel Opocensky, exhibition catalogue, Hanau: Goldschmiedhaus, August 22 - October 17, 2019
"Sandy's Jewelry Collection," in The Grotta Home by Richard Meier: A Marriage of Architecture and Craft, Stuttgart: Arnoldsche Art Publishers, 2019
“Wendy Ramshaw Obituary, The Guardian (January 8, 2019)
Dichotomies of Form and Color, essay for Annamaria Zanella: The Poetry of Material, Stuttgart: Arnoldsche, 2018
“The Russian Art of Movement,” (book review), The Art Newspaper (No. 304, September 2018), page 11
El Lissitzky: The Jewish Period (General Editor; Alexander Kantsedkias, Author), London: Unicorn Press, 2017
“Sculpture in the Expansive Fields: Storm King Art Center,” Hermitage Magazine (Fall 2016)
Konstantiniyye: The Trajectory of Anatolian Culture in the Art of Ahmet Güneştikin, 2011 – 2016, Istanbul: GSM, 2016
Nina Alovert: Motion Captured. Legends of Russian Ballet, exhibition catalogue, National Arts Club, New York, June 13 – 25, 2016
“Barbara Paganin: The Ambiguity of Memory and Objecthood,” in Barbara Paganin: Memoria Aperta, exhibition catalogue, Philadelphia Art Alliance, May 26 – August 14, 2016
“Ponamarev’s World,” in Alexander Ponomarev: Stored in Ice, exhibition catalogue, Richard Taittinger Gallery, April 30 – June 12, 2016, pp. 3 – 6
“Contemporary Israeli Jewelry: A View from Abroad,” in Israeli Jewelry 7, exhibition catalogue, Eretz Israel Museum, Tel Aviv, October 12, 2015 – February 28, 2016
Felix Gonzalez-Torres: Billboards, Radius Books/Artpace San Antonio: 2015. This is the long-awaited publication for the yearlong, statewide exhibition featuring the work of one of Artpace's most renowned residents held on the occasion of the institution's 15th anniversary in 2010.
Thannhauser: The Thannhauser Collection of the Guggenheim Museum (New York: Solomon R. Guggenheim Foundation), 2001

References

External links
Matthew Drutt Interview on db-art.info
Beyeler Foundation

Living people
1962 births
New York University alumni
Yale University alumni
People from Philadelphia
American art curators